Kholmogory is a rural locality (a village) in Shabagishsky Selsoviet, Kuyurgazinsky District, Bashkortostan, Russia. The population was 121 as of 2010. There are 2 streets.

Geography 
Kholmogory is located 4 km west of Yermolayevo (the district's administrative centre) by road. Yermolayevo is the nearest rural locality.

References 

Rural localities in Kuyurgazinsky District